Walter Alexander Riddell (5 August 1881 – 27 July 1963) was a Canadian civil servant, diplomat, and academic. He was the Canadian Advisory Officer to the League of Nations from 1924 to 1937.

Born in Stratford, Ontario to a single working parent, Riddell was the deputy minister of the Department of Labour for the Government of Ontario. From 1920 to 1925, he was the Canadian delegate to the International Labour Organization in Geneva. From 1924 to 1937, he was the Canadian Advisory Officer to the League of Nations. From 1940 to 1946, he was the Canadian High Commissioner to New Zealand. He later taught International Relations at the University of Toronto.

At the League of Nations, he is responsible for what is known as The Riddell Incident, where he tried, oblivious to the desires of Mackenzie King, to place sanctions on Italy led by Benito Mussolini. The sanctions came to be known in the international press as the Canadian proposal, whereupon the government blanched because they were unready to occupy the centre of the world diplomatic stage, and Mackenzie King feared that sanctions on Italy would offend voters in Quebec, where Mussolini was popular with the right-wing, Catholic intelligentsia. He ultimately failed when the Mackenzie King government decided to repudiate the sanctions that he had proposed. The Minister of Justice, Ernest Lapointe, reported to Parliament on 2 December 1935 that:

Later that month, the Hoare–Laval Pact damaged the image of the League. Mussolini continued with the conquest of Ethiopia. Churchill would later need to evict him during the East African campaign of World War II, in order to protect their Egyptian position.

In 1936 King all but declared the death of the League, after Selassie pleaded for help from foreign nations in his 7 June 1936 address to League of Nations.

References

Sources
 

 In Defence of Canada: Appeasement and Rearmament, James Eayrs
 Walter Alexander Riddell fonds

External links
 

1881 births
1963 deaths
20th-century Canadian civil servants
People from Stratford, Ontario
Academic staff of the University of Toronto
High Commissioners of Canada to New Zealand